Anestis Vlachomitros (born 6 November 2001) is a Greek professional footballer who plays as a forward for Super League 2 club Olympiacos B.

Personal life
Vlachomitros' older brother, Andreas, is also a professional footballer.

References

2001 births
Living people
Greek footballers
Super League Greece players
PAS Lamia 1964 players
Association football forwards
Olympiacos F.C. B players
Atromitos F.C. players
People from Euboea (regional unit)
Footballers from Central Greece